João Paulo is a Portuguese given name, the equivalent of "John Paul" in English. Notable people with the name include:

João Paulo (footballer, born 1957), João Paulo de Lima Filho, Brazilian football winger
João Paulo (footballer, born 1964), Sérgio Luís Donizetti, Brazilian football striker
João Paulo (footballer, born 1978), João Paulo da Silva Gouveia Morais, Portuguese football goalkeeper
João Paulo (footballer, born 1980), João Paulo Pinto Ribeiro, Portuguese football centre-forward
João Paulo (footballer, born January 1981), João Paulo Daniel, Brazilian football forward
João Paulo (footballer, born February 1981), João Paulo Azevedo Barbosa, Brazilian football goalkeeper
João Paulo (footballer, born June 1981), João Paulo Andrade, Portuguese football centre-back
João Paulo (footballer, born 1983), João Paulo de Melo Paulino, Brazilian football right-back
João Paulo (footballer, born June 1984), João Paulo Lopes Caetano, Brazilian football winger
João Paulo (footballer, born November 1984), João Paulo Pereira Mendes Bersch, Brazilian football centre-back
João Paulo (footballer, born February 1985), João Paulo da Silva, Brazilian football defensive midfielder
João Paulo (footballer, born June 1985), João Paulo de Oliveira, Brazilian football striker
João Paulo (footballer, born 1986), João Paulo de Souza Dantas, Brazilian football defender
João Paulo (footballer, born March 1988), João Paulo Sales de Souza, Brazilian football forward
João Paulo (footballer, born April 1988), João Paulo de Souza Dantas, Brazilian football defender
João Paulo (footballer, born June 1988), João Paulo da Silva Araújo, Brazilian football forward
João Paulo (footballer, born March 1989), João Paulo Fernando Marangon, Brazilian football midfielder
João Paulo (footballer, born 8 May 1989), João Paulo Pereira Gomes, Portuguese football centre-back
João Paulo (footballer, born 25 May 1989), João Paulo Santos de Oliveira Gomes, Brazilian football defender
João Paulo (footballer, born June 1990), João Paulo da Silva Alves, Brazilian football attacking midfielder
João Paulo (footballer, born July 1990), João Paulo Purcino de Almeida, Brazilian football left-back
João Paulo (footballer, born 1991), João Paulo Mior, Brazilian football midfielder
João Paulo (footballer, born 1992), João Paulo Moreira dos Santos, Portuguese football midfielder
João Paulo (footballer, born 1995), João Paulo Silva Martins, Brazilian football goalkeeper
João Paulo (footballer, born 1996), João Paulo Queiroz de Moraes, Brazilian football forward
João Paulo Fernandes (footballer) (born 1988), João Paulo Moreira Fernandes, Cape Verdean football winger
João Paulo (footballer, born 2001), João Paulo Ribeiro Sovinski, Brazilian football goalkeeper

See also
 João Paulo II (disambiguation)
 John Paul (disambiguation)

Portuguese masculine given names